Emblemaria atlantica, the Banner blenny, is a species of chaenopsid blenny found in coral reefs in the western Atlantic ocean. It can reach a maximum length of  TL.

References
 Jordan, D. S. and B. W. Evermann 1898 (26 Nov.) The fishes of North and Middle America: a descriptive catalogue of the species of fish-like vertebrates found in the waters of North America north of the Isthmus of Panama. Part III. Bulletin of the United States National Museum No. 47: i-xxiv + 2183a-3136.

atlantica
Fish described in 1898
Taxa named by David Starr Jordan